Li Yizhong (born 1945) is a former director of Minister of Industry and Information Technology of the People's Republic of China.

Personal life and Education
Yizhong was born during 1945 in Datong City, Shanxi Province. He graduated Beijing Petroleum College in 1966.

Career
Yizhong is known for his former roles such as head of State Administration of Work Safety, Mayor of Tianjin, and vice-minister in charge of the National Development and Reform Commission.

References

Living people
Government ministers of the People's Republic of China
1945 births